Retinal migraine is a retinal disease often accompanied by migraine headache and typically affects only one eye. It is caused by ischaemia or vascular spasm in or behind the affected eye.

The terms "retinal migraine" and "ocular migraine" are often confused with "visual migraine", which is a far-more-common symptom of vision loss, resulting from the aura phase of migraine with aura. The aura phase of migraine can occur with or without a headache. Ocular or retinal migraines happen in the eye, so only affect the vision in that eye, while visual migraines occur in the brain, so affect the vision in both eyes together. Visual migraines result from cortical spreading depression and are also commonly termed scintillating scotoma.

Symptoms
Retinal migraine is associated with transient monocular visual loss (scotoma) in one eye lasting less than one hour. During some episodes, the visual loss may occur with no headache and at other times throbbing headache on the same side of the head as the visual loss may occur, accompanied by severe light sensitivity and/or nausea. Visual loss tends to affect the entire monocular visual field of one eye, not both eyes. After each episode, normal vision returns.

It may be difficult to read and dangerous to drive a vehicle while retinal migraine symptoms are present.

Retinal migraine is a different disease than scintillating scotoma, which is a visual anomaly caused by spreading depression in the occipital cortex at the back of the brain, not in the eyes nor any component thereof. Unlike in retinal migraine, a scintillating scotoma involves repeated bouts of temporary diminished vision or blindness and affects vision from both eyes, upon which patients may see flashes of light, zigzagging patterns, blind spots, or shimmering spots or stars.

Causes
Retinal migraine is caused by the blood vessels (that leads to the eye) suddenly narrowing (constricting), reducing blood flow to the eye, which causes aura in vision.

It may be triggered by:

Stress
Smoking
High blood pressure 
Oral contraceptive pill
Exercise
Hay Fever
Bending over
High altitude
Dehydration
Low blood sugar
Excessive heat
Eating chocolate

Afterwards, the blood vessels relax, blood flow resumes and sight returns. Usually there are no abnormalities within the eye and permanent damage to the eye is rare.

Retinal migraine tends to be more common in:

Women
People aged under 40
People with a personal or family history of migraines or other headaches
People with an underlying disease (lupus, hardening of the arteries, sickle cell disease, epilepsy, antiphospholipid syndrome, and giant cell arteritis)

Diagnosis
The medical exam should rule out any underlying causes, such as blood clot, stroke, pituitary tumor, or detached retina.  A normal retina exam is consistent with retinal migraine.

Treatment
Treatment depends on identifying behavior that triggers migraine such as stress, sleep deprivation, skipped meals, food sensitivities, or specific activities.  Medicines used to treat retinal migraines include aspirin, other NSAIDS, and medicines that reduce high blood pressure.

Prognosis
In general, the prognosis for retinal migraine is similar to that of migraine headache with typical aura. As the true incidence of retinal migraine is unknown, it is uncertain whether there is a higher incidence of permanent neuro retinal injury.  The visual field data suggests that there is a higher incidence of end arteriolar distribution infraction and a higher incidence of permanent visual field defects in retinal migraine than in clinically manifest cerebral infarctions in migraine with aura.  A 2005 study suggests that more than half of reported recurrent cases of retinal migraine subsequently experienced permanent visual loss in that eye from infarcts, but later studies suggest such loss is a relatively rare side effect.

See also
Entoptic phenomenon
Scintillating scotoma

References

External links 

Neurological disorders
Visual disturbances and blindness
Visual perception

sv:Migrän#Ögonmigrän